Western Cordilleras can refer to
The North American Cordillera, along the western side of North America
Mountain ranges in the Andes of South America:
Cordillera Occidental (Central Andes), in Bolivia and Chile
Cordillera Occidental (Colombia)
Cordillera Occidental (Ecuador)
Cordillera Occidental (Peru)
Part of the Cordillera Central (Luzon) in the Philippines
A mountain range in Borneo